MyEclipse is a commercially available Java EE IDE created and maintained by the company Genuitec, a founding member of the Eclipse Foundation.

MyEclipse is built upon the Eclipse platform, and integrates both proprietary and open source code into the development environment.

MyEclipse has two primary versions (apart from the Blue Edition, Spring Edition,  and Bling Edition referred to below): a Professional and a Standard edition. The Standard edition adds database tools, a visual web designer, persistence tools, Spring tools, Struts and JSF tooling, and a number of other features to the basic Eclipse Java Developer profile. It competes with the Web Tools Project, which is a part of Eclipse itself, but MyEclipse is a separate project entirely and offers a different feature set.

MyEclipse is available via two production-grade streams. The Continuous Integration (CI) stream includes the latest features and fixes, while the Stable stream has less frequent updates and includes only time-tested CI stream updates. 

MyEclipse has also been made available via Secure Delivery Center, a technology that grew from its Pulse (ALM), brand, a provisioning tool that maintains Eclipse software profiles, including those that use MyEclipse. Additionally, MyEclipse is offering a customized version for IBM products, "MyEclipse Blue Edition", that adds specific support for Rational Software and WebSphere development. Currently, MyEclipse Blue Edition is available for Windows and Linux, though Mac is unsupported.

In July 2011, Genuitec released MyEclipse "Bling," which combines the MyEclipse Blue Edition and MyEclipse for Spring product lines into a unified offering.

In January 2015, Genuitec launched the MyEclipse China site (www.myeclipsecn.com) to provide genuine MyEclipse software to large user base in China.

Features available by license

Standard edition

Included with your Standard license:

 Java EE Application Development
 Basic Web Application Development
 Run and Deploy Java EE Applications - excludes WebSphere app servers
 Standard Database Tooling - excludes advanced DB entities
 Standard Maven Support - excludes advanced Java EE wizards
 Persistence Library Support

Professional edition

Included with your Professional license:

 All features from the Standard license
 CodeMix
 Angular & TypeScript
 JSjet with JavaScript Debugging
 CodeLive with Live Preview
 RESTful Web Services
 Advanced Database Tooling - excludes advanced Db2 support
 Advanced Maven Support
 Standard Spring Development- excludes Scaffolding
 Enterprise Reports
 UML 1 and 2 Modeling

Blue edition

Included with your Blue license:

 All features from the Professional license
 WebSphere Application Server Support
 WebSphere Portal Server Support
 WebSphere Liberty Profile Support
 Remote WebSphere Connectors
 In-Workspace WebSphere Deployment
 Advanced Editors for WebSphere
 Application Client Project Support
 Portlet Application Development
 Advanced IBM Db2 Support

Spring edition

Included with your Spring license:

 All features from the Professional license
 Advanced Spring Development
 Scaffolding for Spring Applications
 Advanced JAX-WS with Spring
 Spring DSL Support

Bling edition

Included with your Bling license:

 All features from the Professional license
 All features from the Blue license
 All features from the Spring license

See also
Eclipse
Comparison of integrated development environments (IDEs)

References

External links
 

Integrated development environments
Java development tools
Linux integrated development environments